The 2022–23 Belgian Pro League (officially known as Jupiler Pro League due to sponsorship reasons) is the 120th season of top-tier football in Belgium.

Team changes
After finishing dead last by a very large margin, Beerschot was relegated after two seasons at the highest level, their spot was taken by 2021–22 Belgian First Division B champions Westerlo who returned after spending five seasons at the second tier following their relegation at the end of the 2016–17 season. No other changes happened as Seraing won the Relegation play-off against RWDM, thus staying in the top division.

Format change
At the end of the 2019–20 Belgian First Division A, it was decided to exceptionally cancel any relegations as a result of the league being stopped early due to the COVID-19 pandemic. This caused the league to temporarily expand to 18 as promotions from a lower league did occur as originally planned. It was decided at that point that the goal was to eventually return to 16 teams, and at the end of the 2021–22 Belgian First Division A, the clubs agreed that the 2022–23 season will reduce the number of clubs at the highest level again to 16, as this season only three teams will face direct relegation instead of just one. Furthermore, A new format was also decided from 2023–24 onwards (with 16 teams), returning to a slightly altered version of the playoff structure used prior to the 2019–20 season, but most importantly also increasing the teams relegating each season from 1 to 2 direct plus an additional optional third team through a playoff. A minor change was the renaming of the top two leagues, with the First Division A and First Division B now renamed Jupiler Pro League and Challenger Pro League respectively.

Teams

Stadiums and locations

Number of teams by provinces

Personnel and kits

Managerial changes

Regular season

League table

Results

Positions by round 
The table lists the positions of teams after the completion of each round.

Play-offs

Play-off I
Points obtained during the regular season will be halved (and rounded up) before the start of the playoff.

Play-off II
Points obtained during the regular season will be halved (and rounded up) before the start of the playoff.

Season statistics

Top goalscorers

Clean sheets

Top assists

Hat-tricks

4 Player scored four goals.

Notes

References